Moranville may refer to:

 Moranville Township, Minnesota, United States
 Moranville, Meuse, a commune in the Meuse département, France